The Watertown Arsenal was a major American arsenal located on the northern shore of the Charles River in Watertown, Massachusetts. The site is now registered on the ASCE's List of Historic Civil Engineering Landmarks and on the US National Register of Historic Places, and it is home to a park, restaurants, mixed use office space, and currently serves as the national headquarters for athenahealth.

History

In this role, it replaced the earlier Charlestown Arsenal. The arsenal's earliest plan incorporated 12 buildings aligned along a north–south axis overlooking the river. Alexander Parris, later designer of Quincy Market, was architect. Buildings included a military store and arsenal, as well as shops and housing for officers and men. All were made of brick with slate roofs in the Federal style, and a high wall enclosed the compound. By 1819 all buildings were completed and occupied.

The arsenal's site, duties, and buildings grew gradually until the American Civil War, enlarging beyond the original quadrangle. During the war it greatly expanded to produce field and coastal gun carriages, and the war's impetus led to the quick construction of a large machine shop and smith shop built as contemporary factories, as well as a number of smaller buildings.

During the Civil War, a new commander's quarters was commissioned by then-Capt. Thomas J. Rodman, inventor of the Rodman gun. The lavish, quarters would ultimately become one of the largest commander's quarters on any US military installation. This mansion is now on the National Register of Historic Places. The expense ($63,478.65) was considered wasteful and excessive and drew a stern rebuke from Congress, which then promoted Rodman to brigadier general and sent him to command Rock Island Arsenal on the frontier in Illinois, where he built an even larger commander's quarters.

Activities and new construction at the Watertown Arsenal continued to gradually expand until the early 1890s.

Activities changed decisively in 1892 when Congress authorized modernization to gun carriage manufacturing. At this point the arsenal became a manufacturing complex rather than storage depot. A number of major buildings were constructed, which over time began to reflect typical industrial facilities rather than the earlier arsenal styles. In 1897 an additional  were purchased, and a hospital built.

Scientific management was implemented at the arsenal between 1908 and 1915. It was considered by the War Department as successful in saving money over the alternatives; but it was so hated by the work force that the Congress eventually overturned its use.

During World War I the arsenal nearly tripled in size. Building #311 was then reported to be one of the largest steel-frame structures in the United States, sized to accommodate both very large gun carriages and the equipment used to construct them. Railroad tracks ran throughout the arsenal complex. World War II brought an additional  with existing industrial buildings, as the arsenal produced steel artillery pieces. In 1959–1960, a research nuclear reactor (Horace Hardy Lester Reactor) was constructed on site, for material research programs, and operated there until 1970.

In 1968 the Army ceased operations at the arsenal;  were sold to the Watertown Redevelopment Authority, while the remaining  were converted to the United States Army Materials and Mechanics Research Center (AMMRC), renamed the United States Army Materials Technology Laboratory (MTL) in 1985. In 1995 all Army activity ceased and the remainder of the site was converted to civilian use.

The Armory site was formerly included on US EPA's National Priorities List of highly contaminated sites, more widely known as Superfund. The site was removed from the NPL in 2006.

See also 

 List of Historic Civil Engineering Landmarks
 National Register of Historic Places listings in Middlesex County, Massachusetts
 List of military installations in Massachusetts

References

Bibliography

 Aitken, Hugh G. J. (1985; first published 1960), Scientific Management in Action: Taylorism at Watertown Arsenal, 1908–1915, Princeton University Press, Princeton, NJ, US. . . First published in 1960 by Harvard University Press. Republished in 1985 by Princeton University Press, with a new foreword by Merritt Roe Smith.
 Earls, Alan R., 2007 Watertown Arsenal, (Images of America), Arcadia Publishing, Charleston, SC, United States.


External links 

Official Website of the former Watertown Arsenal Commander's Quarters
Historic American Engineering Record documentation, filed under Watertown, Middlesex County, MA:

Industrial buildings and structures on the National Register of Historic Places in Massachusetts
Historic districts on the National Register of Historic Places in Massachusetts
Buildings and structures in Watertown, Massachusetts
Armories on the National Register of Historic Places in Massachusetts
Historic American Engineering Record in Massachusetts
Historic Civil Engineering Landmarks
Massachusetts in the American Civil War
United States Army arsenals during World War II
Superfund sites in Massachusetts
National Register of Historic Places in Middlesex County, Massachusetts
1816 establishments in Massachusetts
Installations of the U.S. Army in Massachusetts
Closed installations of the United States Army